Land of Wind may refer to:

 The Land of Wind, a 2008 South Korean drama
 The Land of Wind, a nation in the fictional universe of the ninja manga, Naruto